Cara A. Clemente (born October 2, 1966) is an American politician who has served in the Michigan House of Representatives from the 14th district since 2017.

References

1966 births
Living people
Democratic Party members of the Michigan House of Representatives
Women state legislators in Michigan
21st-century American politicians
21st-century American women politicians